Aleph Yodh He was an professional Medical Fraternity for Jewish Students.

History
The Fraternity had three divisions, its Eastern functioning as Aleph Yodh He, a Middle Western section functioning as Zeta Mu Phi and the Western functioning as Phi Lambda Kappa. At a convention in 1921, these three divisions merged into Phi Lambda Kappa.

Chapter List
As of 1915:
1908, Alpha, Chicago College of Medicine and Surgery
1910, Beta, College of Physicians and Surgeons (Chicago)
1912, Gamma, Jenner Medical College.
1913, Delta, Loyola University (Bennett Medical College).
1914, Epsilon, University of Pennsylvania.
1914, Zeta, Jefferson Medical College.
1914, Eta, Medico Chirurgical College (Philadelphia).
1914, Theta, University of Maryland
1914, Iota, Temple University

See also 
List of Jewish fraternities and sororities

References

Historically Jewish fraternities in the United States
Professional medical fraternities and sororities in the United States
Jewish organizations established in 1908